Gregory "Greg" Siff (born December 21, 1977) is an American visual artist, designer, writer and actor who lives and works in Los Angeles.

Art career 
Siff was born in Brooklyn, New York. He creates images that blend Pop Art and Abstract-expressionism. His distinct handmade style merges elements of abstraction, street, and fine art while his work embodies emotionalism normally absent in urban art.

Siff's first exhibition, "the heartfirebreathemanifesto" was hosted at the Standard Hotel in Hollywood on February 13, 2006 with all proceeds from this exhibit donated to J.U.i.C.E. (Justice By Uniting in Creative Energy). Since 2006 Siff has exhibited all over the world including Los Angeles, New York, London, Italy, Dublin, and Vancouver.

Siff has done commissions and installations for Deitch Projects, The Standard Hotel, Mercedes Benz, Tumblr, Christie's, Sotheby's, Vans, Red Bull, The Art of Elysium, Siren Studios, Wexlers Deli, and Warner Bros. Records among others. In addition, Siff has collaborated with artists RISK, James Georgopoulos, 2wenty and Beau Dunn. His work has been seen in publications such as Interview, Treats Magazine, The Wall Street Journal, LA Times, Complex, and LA Weekly.

In Spring 2013, Siff was selected by Vans Custom Culture to be one of their "Art Ambassadors", inspiring students across the United States to embrace their creativity. His hand-painted custom Vans sneakers were on view at The Whitney Museum of American Art in New York City. Siff's work can be seen at ACE Museum in Los Angeles where he painted a mural for a charity art auction held by renowned auction house, Christie's and non-profit, The Art of Elysium.

In October 2013 Siff collaborated with Helmut Lang and Project Angel Food, a Los Angeles-based charity whose mission is to help those affected by HIV/AIDS, Cancer, Diabetes, and other life-threatening diseases. In this collaboration he hand painted 21 limited edition, one of a kind Helmut Lang tees. "The line work, characters, and poetry aimed to nourish the body and spirit, just as Project Angel Food does with their mission," said Siff.  The private event was held on October 17 at Helmut Lang's flagship store on Melrose Avenue in West Hollywood, CA. All 21 tees were sold out and 100% of the proceeds from the sale of these original works benefited Project Angel Food.

In April 2014, the Santa Monica Museum of Art showcased a recreation of Siff's downtown Los Angeles art studio where he painted 50 portraits of the homeless youth he encountered while spending a day at the Safe Place For Youth for the Face 2 Face Fundraising Gala.

Also in April 2014, Siff exhibited in the Santa Monica Museum of Art's Precognito/Incognito 10 alongside work from Ed Ruscha, John Baldessari, Sage Vaughn and Oscar Murillo.

In June 2014, Siff's work was included in The Museum of Modern Art PS1 exhibition Rockaway! to celebrate the ongoing post-Superstorm Sandy Recovery.  Curated by MoMA PS1's director Klaus Biesenbach, in close collaboration with Patti Smith, Rockaway Beach Surf Club, the Honolulu Biennal, and the Rockaway Artist Alliance, this group show included the "Experience Rooms," Siff painted in the Rockaway Beach Surf Club bathrooms. Other artists in the exhibition included, Marina Abramovic, Patti Smith, Janet Cardiff, Brandon D'Leo, James Franco, Michael Stipe, Tom Sachs, and Adrián Villar Rojas.

In 2017, Siff collaborated with luxury fashion house Saint Laurent, bringing his imagery to the new Winter YSL 2017 Women's and Men's Ready to Wear Line.

Film, television and theater career 
As an actor, Siff started out on stage at the New York City Opera at Lincoln Center. Among the operas he sang in were; Carmen, Tosca, Lucia, and Turandot. He has been cast in the dual role of Barry Williams/Greg Brady in Fox's True-Life story of, The Brady Bunch: The Final Days. In I.F.C.'s Rome & Jewel, a modern update of William Shakespeare's Romeo and Juliet, he played the role of Tybalt. He had a supporting role in the 2003 Kelly Clarkson and Justin Guarini film From Justin to Kelly, as Justin's friend "Brandon". He has also guest starred on Showtime's Nurse Jackie, HBO's, How to Make It in America, and C.S.I.: NY.

In 2008, Siff wrote and starred in, The Nothing Boys, a critically acclaimed semi-autobiographical play about a young man who returns home to his high school for his 10-year reunion only to find one other student in attendance. The Nothing Boys was produced by Rob Weiss, best known as producer of HBO's Entourage.  The play ran from May 2 through July 27 in Hollywood's Theater District. A portion of the proceeds from, The Nothing Boys was donated to Covenant House California.

In Spring 2010, Siff's experimental art short film, Sequential Paint, written and directed by Stephen Dackson, was a featured selection at the NewFilmmakers Series in New York City's Anthology Film Archives. The film also screened at various exhibits, art shows and galleries in Los Angeles, including the opener of the 2006 Santa Ana Film Festival.

As a voice actor Siff appears in the video game series, Grand Theft Auto as the voice and body of Rocco Pelosi. Rocco Pelosi is featured in Grand Theft Auto IV: The Ballad of Gay Tony (2009) and Grand Theft Auto V (2013).

Selected exhibitions

2006–2011 
 theheartfirebreathemanifesto, The Standard, Hollywood, CA. February 13, 2006
 The Marshmallow Show, The Standard Hotel, Hollywood, CA. November 12, 2006
 Don't You Let Me Go Tonight, Kaffe 1668 Gallery, TriBeCa, NY. January 2009
 G. (11-11-11), LA Fonderie, Los Angeles, CA. November 11–13, 2011

2012 
 There & Back, Siren Studios Rooftop Sessions, Los Angeles, CA. March 1, 2012
 Matter of Time, Gallery Brown, Los Angeles, CA. October 20, 2012
 GetArt 5, Project Angel Food, Hollywood, CA, June 2, 2012
 The Usual Suspects – Lab Art, Los Angeles, CA. May 19, 2012
 D.I.Z.N.I., Graffik Gallery, London, UK, May 17, 2012
 Downtown Art Walk – Art Battles, Los Angeles, CA. May 10, 2012
 Guerilla One Cahuenga Corridor, Hollywood, CA May 6, 2012
 Communities in Schools, School Life, Bel Air, CA. May 1, 2012
 New Urban Voices, Maximillian Gallery, West Hollywood, March 31, 2012
 Venice Art Walk & Auctions / Surf & Skate Boardriders Quiksilver, Venice, CA. April 27, 2012
 Red Bull Curates: The Road to Art Basel, Los Angeles, CA. April 5, 2012
 Vinyl Revisionists, Warner Bros. Records, Burbank, CA. March 30, 2012
 There & Back, Siren Studios Rooftop Sessions, Los Angeles, CA. March 1, 2012
 Matter of Time, Gallery Brown, Los Angeles, CA. October 20, 2012

2013 
15th Annual Postcards from the Edge, Visual AIDS, New York City, January 25, 2013
 Ascending Human, Ethos Gallery, Los Angeles, January 10, 2013
 LA Art Show, Art of Elysium, January 23, 2013
 One Night Stand, The Arts Fund, San Francisco, CA, January 25, 2013
Pieces of Heaven, The Art of Elysium and Christie's Auction House, Ace Museum, LA, February 20, 2013
 Sound of the Streets, Warner Bros. Records, LA, March 1, 2013
 G.I. Joe Tribute Show, The Loyal Subjects, LA, March 23, 2013
 Tarot: Art of Fortune, Modern Eden Gallery, San Francisco, March 16, 2013
 Kissing Lying Crying, AV, Los Angeles, March 29, 2013
 Sound of the Streets pt. II, Hot Rod LA, April 6, 2013
 Between Paint and Light, 2wenty x Gregory, Loakl Gallery, Oakland, CA, May 3, 2013
 American All Star, Gallery Brown, LA, May 18, 2013
 The Little Things, Ethos Gallery, LA, May 10, 2013
 Venice Family Clinic Print Pop Collection, Google HQ, Venice, CA, May 19, 2013
 Vans Custom Culture, The Whitney Museum of American Art, New York City, June 11, 2013
 Fast Weekend, The StadiumRed Estate, The Hamptons, NY, June 15, 2013
 Word Play, Design Matters, LA, June 29, 2013
 Melrose Art Ride, Ethos Gallery, LA, July 14, 2013
San Diego Comic Con, Wired Magazine x Kia, July 18, 2013
 Let it Fly Project, Burbank CA, August 3, 2013
 Sunset Strip Music Festival, Ethos Gallery, Hollywood CA August 3, 2013

Art Battles LA, Exchange LA, August 8, 2013
 Lady Shark Week, Burgundy Room, Hollywood CA, August 9, 2013
  Survive Anything, Exchange Alley, NYC, August 15, 2013
 M.O.M. Made of Memories, KGB Gallery, LA, August 10, 2013
 The Lost Warhols Collection, Karen Bystedt, Teddy's Lounge, The Roosevelt, September 12, 2013
 SICKY Art in the Lot, FameYard, LA, September 14, 2013
 The 5th Element, Guerilla One x Gallery 446, Palm Springs, CA September 28, 2013

2014
The Art of Elysium's Pieces of Heaven Gala, Chalkboard, Siren Studios, February 2014
LA Art Show – Lawrence Cantor Fine Art Booth, Andy Warhol series, 2014
The Loyal Subjects x Toy Tokyo, Optimus Prime group show, February 2014
Gibson Guitartown on the Sunset Strip Charity Auction, February 2014
ONE LOVE, Woven Accents, Los Angeles, February 14, 2014
Gregory Siff – Bodice, Venice Family Clinic, Venice Art Walk, 2014
Steer Ahead- Group Show, Soze Gallery, April 2014

2015
The Dean Collection, Swizz Beatz, No Commission, Miami Beach, Art Basel
The Art of Elysium Pieces of Heaven, Christie's, MAMA Gallery, Los Angeles
Marc Jacobs, Hotel Studio Book by Louisxxx and Gregory.
Mercedes Benz Evolution Tour (live mural), Los Angeles
Venice Family Clinic Auction, Los Angeles 
New York Fashion Week SS16
Freedom, Pharrell Music Video

2016
Portrait of an American Ice Cream Man, Mercedes-Benz & 4AM, DTLA
High Fashion Something, Surf Lodge at W South Beach, Mercedes-Benz x DSTLD x 4 am
Punks, Poets and Provocateurs, The Barn, Gruin Gallery South Hampton, NY
Hetrick-Martin Institute, South Hampton, NY
MCA Day, Group Tribute to Beastie Boy, Adam Yauch, Brooklyn, NY
Selections of Portrait of an American Ice Cream Man, Gallery Valentine, East Hampton, NY
The Art of Elysium Pieces of Heaven, Siren Studios Highland, Los Angeles

2017
Museum at Fashion Institute of Technology, Pyer Moss #blacklivesmatter, New York City
Happiness Dealer, Samuel Owen Gallery, Nantucket, MA
From Canvas to Catwalk, Breakfast with Gregory Siff, Soho House, New York City
The Art of Elysium 20th Anniversary Auction and Sotheby's Panel, Los Angeles, CA
Avenue Los Angeles, Installation "All These James Deans" Hollywood, CA
University of Southern California Fashion + Social Media Panel and Mural, USC Annenberg Center, CA

References

External links 
 
 

1977 births
Living people
American male film actors
American male television actors
Writers from Brooklyn
21st-century American dramatists and playwrights
Male actors from New York City
Artists from New York City